Go Green Racing is an American professional stock car racing team that is currently on hiatus in the NASCAR Xfinity Series. The team debuted in NASCAR competition in 2009, competing in the Nationwide Series, before adding a part-time Sprint Cup Series team in 2012. The team, which raced with 14 different drivers in the 2011 season, is headquartered in Old Orchard Beach, Maine, but operates from a shop in Mooresville, North Carolina. In 2014, St. Hilaire closed down his Nationwide Series operation to merge the team into Go FAS Racing with Frank Stoddard. In 2018, the team returned to the Xfinity Series with driver Joey Gase, but parted ways with Gase at the end of the year.

Xfinity Series

Car No. 35 history
On January 5, 2018, Go Green Racing announced that they would be returning to the Xfinity Series full time with Joey Gase. The number was announced as No. 35, and Sparks Energy as the primary sponsor. Go Green fielded cars out of the same shop as SS-Green Light Racing, although the two organizations remained separate. Gase ultimately finished 20th in the final point standings at season's end.

At the end of 2018, MBM Motorsports took over the No. 35 team with Gase still as the driver, and Go Green has been inactive ever since.

Car No. 35 results

Car No. 79 history

Owned by Archie St. Hilaire, Go Green Racing was founded in 2009, making its debut in the Nationwide Series with the No. 39 Ford in the Kroger On Track for the Cure 250 at Memphis Motorsports Park with driver Eddie MacDonald, finishing 22nd. The team ran three races in 2010 with Charles Lewandoski and Sean Caisse driving, before running the full Nationwide Series schedule for the first time in 2011 with Josh Wise, Lewandoski, Danny O'Quinn, Jr., Danny Efland, Luis Martinez, Jr., Will Kimmel, Matt Frahm, Joey Gase, Casey Roderick, Fain Skinner, and Matt Carter all sharing time in the No. 39 car. The No. 39 posted a best finish of 13th, at Road America with Wise driving, and finished 26th in owner standings at the end of the 2011 season.

The No. 39 car started the 2012 season with Joey Gase as its regular driver, competing for Rookie of the Year in the Nationwide Series; however, a lack of funding meant that Gase was released from the ride after the fifth race of the year, with Bires and Frahm each running a race in the car before Josh Richards took over regular driving duties starting at Talladega Superspeedway. Grand-Am driver Matt Bell drove the car at Road America, Jeffrey Earnhardt drove the No. 39 as a Chevrolet at Indy and Charlotte, while Tim Andrews, Carter and Canadian driver Dexter Stacey finished out the season. For 2013, Earnhardt was drive the newly numbered 79 car full-time.  However, the team later scaled back to a partial schedule.  Earnhardt would leave for JD Motorsports at season's end, and Hilaire subsequently shut down the Nationwide program upon the team's merger with FAS Lane in the Cup Series.

Car No. 04 history
The No. 04 Ford made its debut as Go Green's second car at the 5-hour Energy 200 at Dover International Speedway in the spring of 2011. Primarily running as a start and park car, Lewandoski, Kelly Bires, Efland, O'Quinn, Benny Gordon, Tim Andrews, and Roderick competed in the car during the year; The No. 04 car posted a best finish of 28th at Bristol Motor Speedway in August with Gordon driving, the only race the car completed all season, and finished 49th in the series owner standings.

For 2012, it was planned for Andrews to make semi-regular starts in the No. 04 car, sharing it with several other drivers; However it never ended up attempting any races.

Sprint Cup Series

Car No. 52 history
Paulie Harraka drove the No. 52 Ford at 2013 Sonoma, using Brian Keselowski Motorsports' owners points to make the field. Harraka crashed his car before the start of the race but the team was able to make repairs and finished 39th.

Car No. 79 history
For the 2012 season, Go Green Racing added a part-time NASCAR Sprint Cup Series team to their racing efforts, with driver Tim Andrews being hired to drive and his father Paul Andrews acting as crew chief; they were the first father and son driver and crew chief combination in the series since 1987. The team planned to attempt 10 to 12 races over the course of the season. Andrews failed to qualify in the team's first effort at the STP 400 at Kansas Speedway; veteran Scott Speed was hired to drive the No. 79 Ford, qualifying for the Bojangles Southern 500 at Darlington Raceway for the team's first race, where he finished 42nd; at Dover later that spring, he qualified for the team's second straight race, only to be caught up in an early wreck and finish 43rd.

Car No. 32 history

In late 2013, Go Green and FAS Lane Racing announced that they were entering into an alliance to jointly field the No. 32 in the Sprint Cup Series in 2014.

K&N Pro Series East
Go Green Racing has also operated a racing team in the development series K&N Pro Series East; in 2012 they announced plans to have a "Young Guns" competition to select a Maine driver to drive the team's car at New Hampshire Motor Speedway in September, the selected driver was Austin Theriault. The team also regularly enters cars in the TD Bank 250 at Oxford Plains Speedway, considered by racers to be the premier auto race held in the state of Maine; Jeffrey Earnhardt and Kevin Lepage have driven for the team in the event.

References

External links
 
 

NASCAR teams
2009 establishments in the United States
Companies based in Maine